Crescent Mountain may refer to:

Crescent Mountain (Washington)
Crescent Mountain (Oregon)